KD Lekiu is a  guided missile frigate currently serving in the Royal Malaysian Navy and one of the major naval assets for Malaysia. Together with her sister ship Jebat, Lekiu serves in the 23rd Frigate Squadron of the Royal Malaysian Navy.

Development
The ships were built  by Yarrow Shipbuilders of Glasgow (now BAE Systems Surface Ships) of United Kingdom based on the F2000 frigate design. Lekiu was launched in December 1994 and commissioned May 1999. Although the Lekiu was launched first then the Jebat, but Jebat carries the lower pennant number (FFG29) compared to Lekiu (FFG30) to signify the seniority of this ship, which accommodates the Admiral of the Royal Malaysian Navy. (Hang Jebat succeeded Hang Tuah as Laksamana (Admiral) of the Malacca Sultanate, while Hang Lekiu was never made a Laksamana.).

Characteristic

As for the weapon systems, Lekiu equipped with one Bofors 57 mm gun and two MSI DS30M 30 mm cannon. For the missiles, there was 16 Sea Wolf surface-to-air missile for air defence and 8 MM40 Exocet block 2 anti-ship missile for anti surface warfare. Two triple Eurotorp B515 with A244-S ASW torpedoes also installed for anti submarine warfare.

References

1995 ships
Frigates of Malaysia
Lekiu-class frigates
Ships built on the River Clyde